

Matches 

The first match of IPL 2011 saw defending champions Chennai Super Kings start off their title defense with a home game against Kolkata Knight Riders. Chennai captain MS Dhoni won the toss and elected to bat first. But it was Kolkata who got the start getting the wicket of Murali Vijay for 4 (4b, 1x4) in the first over. New batsman Suresh Raina then consolidated with Anirudha Srikkanth before accelerating, having some luck in the way as Yusuf Pathan dropped both batsmen, as Chennai reached a good score of 78/1 after 10 overs. Anirudha was dropped again, but next ball Raina was caught for 33 (29b, 4x4) off Pathan. MS Dhoni came to the crease, and despite having a good partnership with Anirudha who reached his half-century, Chennai were unable to up the run-rate. Jacques Kallis got Dhoni for 29 (21b, 1x4, 1x6) in the 18th over and followed it up by getting Anirudha out for 64 (55b, 6x4, 2x6) leaving Chennai 138/3 with 4 balls left before Albie Morkel's quick 15 (9b, 1x4, 1x6) got Chennai to 153/4 at the end of their 20 overs.

In reply, Kolkata started off well, with openers Manvinder Bisla and Jacques Kallis reaching 50 without losing a wicket in under 6 overs, but Chennai fought back after the Powerplay, restricting the flow of runs and finally getting Bisla for 27 (29b, 3x4). Yusuf Pathan came in and rapidly increased the run rate along with Kallis, and with Kolkata seemingly cruising at 93/1 in under 13 overs, a brilliant throw from Dhoni had Pathan run out for 11 (12b, 1x6). Kallis motored on to his half-century, but mistimed a sweep to short fine-leg on 54 (42b, 7x4) and this started a slump, with Eoin Morgan going cheaply for 6 (6b, 1x4) and captain Gautam Gambhir for 1 (2b). The runs dried up, but with the equation looking difficult, a couple of sixes by Manoj Tiwary off Suraj Randiv reduced it to 9 off 8 balls. A dot ball followed and then Tiwary was stumped off the next ball for 27 (15b, 1x4, 2x6) leaving Kolkata 9 to get off the last over. With 7 required off 5, Tim Southee got the wicket of set Laxmi Shukla for 14 (10b, 2x4) leaving 7 off 4. The new batsmen were unable to hit a boundary, and Rajat Bhatia only managed a leg-bye with 4 required off the last ball, as Chennai won by just 2 runs.

Match 2 saw the Deccan Chargers playing the Rajasthan Royals at home, and it was Rajasthan who elected to field after winning the toss. The Deccan openers, Shikhar Dhawan and Ishank Jaggi however, got their team off to a flyer, both men hitting some well-placed boundaries as they reached 40 in 4.4 overs. Dhawan then went for one shot too many and was caught on 24 (15b, 2x4, 1x6). Siddharth Trivedi then got Deccan captain Kumar Sangakkara for a duck and Bharat Chipli for 6 (9b, 1x4) to reduce Deccan to 53–3. Along with captain Shane Warne who then had Jaggi hole out to long on for 25 (28b, 3x4) and JP Duminy also hole out for 14 (17b, 1x6) to reduce Deccan to 77-5 after 13 overs, run rate below 6. Daniel Christian and Dwaraka Ravi Teja then started a minor recovery, adding 37 in just over 4 overs until Trivedi returned to get Christian for 26 (19b, 1x4, 2x6), finishing with great figures of 3/15 (4 overs). Ravi Teja also accelerated until he too holed out for 28 (20b, 2x4, 1x6) at the start of the last over. Deccan managed 7 runs after this wicket, and finished on 137/8 from their 20 overs.

The Rajasthan chase started perfectly, with opener Amit Paunikar giving them a start by hitting a string of boundaries in the first two overs. The Deccan bowlers then staged a minor fightback, drying up the runs before Dale Steyn got Paunikar to edge one to the keeper on 20 (19b, 4x4). Rahul Dravid and Johan Botha consolidated first, getting themselves set before increasing the run rate with a boundary on average every over, also keeping the required run rate in check. Steyn returned to bowl Dravid for 28 (35b, 2x4) but Botha hit some more boundaries to give the momentum back to Rajasthan. He went on to reach his 50 and exploded after that, and the Deccan bowlers had no more success. Rajasthan reached their target with more than an over left, with Botha not out on 67 (47b, 8x4, 1x6) and a quick unbeaten 21 (14b, 1x4, 2x6) from Ross Taylor.

The Kochi Tuskers Kerala, one of the new franchises had their first ever IPL match, a home one to a revamped Royal Challengers Bangalore. Kochi won the toss and elected to bat first, and the decision was vindicated as the openers got off to a brilliant start. Brendon McCullum started off by hitting Dirk Nannes for two fours and a six at the start of the second over, and later VVS Laxman also joined in. The 6th over, bowled by Abhimanyu Mithun went for 18, and Kochi were off to a brilliant start at 61/0 after 6 overs. They continued to go strongly, until Laxman hit a slog-sweep straight to deep midwicket while on 36 (29b, 2x4, 2x6), but Kochi were still well placed at 80/1 after 9 overs. But, McCullum fell soon after when trying to hit a scoop off part-timer Virat Kohli on 45 (32b, 4x4, 2x6) and the run rate began to slow down. Captain Mahela Jayawardene was stumped for 18 (18b, 2x4) while trying to increase the run rate, and Kochi were 126/3 with 4 overs left but Brad Hodge then hit a couple of boundaries until Zaheer Khan smashed his leg stump while on 27 (21b, 3x4). Raiphi Gomez went for a first-baller but Ravindra Jadeja stayed not out on 23 (16b, 2x4, 1x6) to carry Kochi to 161/5.

The Bangalore reply didn't start off too well, with opener Tillakaratne Dilshan slicing one to cover at the start of the second over having scored just 1 (4b). Mayank Agarwal and Virat Kohli then recovered, with the former hitting some big shots and latter some elegant boundaries, until Kohli was trapped in front by Vinay Kumar on 23 (18b, 4x4) but Bangalore were 48/2 after 6 overs, well on course with the required rate. Bangalore continued to move rapidly, with Agarwal hitting legendary spinner Muttiah Muralitharan for six in his first ball and AB de Villiers brilliantly scooping Sreesanth for six. Agarwal then found long-off on 33 (24b, 2x4, 2x6), leaving Bangalore at 85/3 after 10 overs, and a required run rate of 7.7. de Villiers and Saurabh Tiwary started to consolidate but however, some good bowling by the top Kochi bowlers restricted the flow of runs and left Bangalore with 33 needed off 3 overs. The 18th over, bowled by parttimer Raiphi Gomez proved decisive. First hit for a six by de Villiers, he fought back to get the wicket of Tiwary for 26 (24b, 2x4) but de Villiers hit the last two balls for sixes, getting his half-century and leaving Bangalore with just 13 off 2 overs. Asad Pathan hit three boundaries in the next over and finished off the match, with Bangalore winning by six wickets. de Villiers was not out on 54 (40b, 1x4, 5x6), a matchwinning knock.

Group Stage